The Argentine Army to the Effort and Abnegation Medal is awarded to members of the Argentine Armed Forces.

Orders, decorations, and medals of Argentina